The  is a museum of Japanese crafts in Kanazawa, Ishikawa Prefecture, Japan. Still retaining the more formal, official designation , it forms part of the Independent Administrative Institution . As part of the government policy of regional revitalization, the facility relocated in 2020 from Kitanomaru Park in Tokyo, where it first opened in 1977. It is now housed in two Western-style buildings of the Meiji period that have themselves been relocated from elsewhere in Kanazawa, reassembled, and restored, the 1898 Old 9th Division Command Headquarters and 1909 Old Army Generals Club. From the collection of some 3,800 items, by craftsmen from all over Japan, some 1,900 have been transferred, including approximately 1,400 by "holders" and preservers of Important Intangible Cultural Properties, who are often referred to as "Living National Treasures", and members of the Japan Art Academy.

See also

 Ishikawa Prefectural Museum of Art
 Ishikawa Prefectural History Museum
 21st Century Museum of Contemporary Art, Kanazawa
 Kenroku-en
 Mingei
 Japanese-Western Eclectic Architecture

References

External links
 National Crafts Museum

Buildings and structures in Kanazawa, Ishikawa
Museums in Ishikawa Prefecture
Japanese crafts
Museums established in 2020
2020 establishments in Japan